Kalachhara is a village in Chanditala II community development block of Srirampore subdivision in Hooghly district in the Indian state of West Bengal.

Geography
Chanditala police station serves this Village.

Gram panchayat
Villages and census towns in Chanditala gram panchayat are: Bamandanga, Benipur, Chanditala, Kalachhara and Pairagachha.

Demographics
As per 2011 Census of India, Kalachhara had a total population of 4,225 of which 2,134 (51%) were males and 2,091 (49%) were females. Population below 6 years was 385. The total number of literates in Kalachhara was 3,373 (87.84% of the population over 6 years).

Transport

Railway and road
Janai Road railway station is the nearest railway station on the Howrah-Bardhaman chord of Kolkata Suburban Railway network. The main road is SH 15 (Ahilyabai Holkar Road). It is the main road of the village and is connected to NH 19 (old number NH 2).

Bus

Private Bus
 26 Bonhooghly - Champadanga
 26A Serampore - Aushbati
 26C Bonhooghly - Jagatballavpur

Bus Routes without Numbers
 Howrah Station - Bandar (Dhanyaghori)
 Dakshineswar - Bhagabatipur

References 

Villages in Chanditala II CD Block